Ansa (Latin for "handle") or ANSA may refer to:

Organizations
 Agenzia Nazionale Stampa Associata, Italian news agency
 Ansa Mediterranean or ANSAmed, section of the above
 Applied Neuroscience Society of Australasia
 Association of Norwegian Students Abroad

Science and technology

Anatomy
 Ansa cervicalis, a loop of nerves that are part of the cervical plexus
 Ansa lenticularis, a part of the brain, making up the superior layer of the substantia innominata of Meynert
 Loop of Henle (ansa nephroni), a portion of a nephron in the kidney
 Ansa of the tympanal organ

Astronomy
 Ansae, compact nebulosities such as can be found in protoplanetary nebulae
 One of the apparent ends of the rings of Saturn

Computing
 Advanced Networked Systems Architecture, a 1990s, pre-CORBA, distributed systems architecture
 ANSA Pre-processor, commercial pre-processing software (Automatic Net-generation for Structural Analysis)

Other uses in science and technology
 Ansa (moth), a genus of moth
 In archaeology, the engraved and ornamented handle of a vase
 Bridge (chemical) between two functional groups/ligands
 Ansa-metallocene

People
 Ansa, Queen of the Lombards (  753–774), wife of Desiderius, king of the Lombards
 Ansa Ikonen (1913–1989), Finnish actress
 Tina McElroy Ansa (born 1949), African American novelist, filmmaker, teacher, and journalist

Other uses
 ANSA, equivalent of NASA in the 1968 film Planet of the Apes
 Armed non-state actors, a term used in political science
 National Security Advisor (United States), Assistant to the President for National Security Affairs

See also
 Ansah, a given name and surname
 Anza (disambiguation)